was a Japanese politician of the Liberal Democratic Party, a member of the House of Representatives in the Diet (national legislature). A native of Iwaki, Fukushima and graduate of Chuo University, he had served in the city assembly of Iwaki since 1972 and in the assembly of Fukushima Prefecture for three terms since 1975. In 1986, he ran unsuccessfully for the House of Representatives. He ran again four years later and was elected for the first time. He died on 4 November 2018 at the age of 74 from heart failure.

References

External links 
 Official website in Japanese.

1944 births
2018 deaths
Politicians from Fukushima Prefecture
Chuo University alumni
Members of the House of Representatives (Japan)
Liberal Democratic Party (Japan) politicians
21st-century Japanese politicians